Jane Balme  is a Professor of Archaeology at the University of Western Australia. She is an expert on early Indigenous groups and Australian archaeology.

Biography 
Balme studied for an undergraduate degree in Anthropology at the University of Western Australia, graduating in 1979. Balme worked on cave sites in south west Australia for the Western Australian Museum and became interested in archaeology.

Balme completed her PhD at the Australian National University in 1990.

Her research focuses on early Indigenous groups in Australia, gendered social organisation, and the discipline of archaeology.

Balme has authored a wide range of journal articles, a textbook Archaeology in Practice: A Student Guide to Archaeological Analyses with Alistair Paterson, and the edited volumes Gendered Archaeology with Wendy Beck, and More Unconsidered Trifles : Papers to Celebrate the Career of Sandra Bowdler. A review of Archaeology in Practice states that "It is rare that a book is written as a text book but also provides an important contribution to the discipline and this volume deserves this dual recognition."

Balme has been strongly involved with the Australian Archaeological Association, serving as secretary and chair of the Australian National Committee for Archaeology Teaching and Learning.

In November 2018 Balme was elected Fellow of the Australian Academy of the Humanities.

Selected publications 

Balme, J., O’Connor, S. & Fallon, S. 2018. New dates on dingo bones from Madura Cave provide oldest firm evidence for arrival of the species in Australia. Scientific Reports. 8, 1, 9933
Balme, J. and O'Connor, S. 2016. Dingoes and Aboriginal social organisation in Holocene Australia. Journal of Archaeological Science: Reports 7: 775–781.
Balme, J. and O'Connor, S. 2015. A 'port scene', identity and rock art of the inland Southern Kimberley, Western Australia. Rock Art Research 32 (1): 75–83.
Balme, J. and Paterson, A. 2014. Archaeology in Practice. 
Balme, J. 2013. Of boats and string: the maritime colonisation of Australia. Quaternary International 285: 68–75. 
Bowdler, S. and Balme, J. 2010. Gatherers and grannies: further thoughts on the origins of gender. Australian Feminist Studies 25: 391–405. 
Balme, J., Davidson, I., Mcdonald, J., Stern, N., Veth, P. Symbolic behaviour and the peopling of the southern arc route to Australia. Quaternary International 202 (1/2): 59–68. 
Balme, J. and Bulbeck, C. Engendering Origins : Theories of Gender in Sociology and Archaeology. Australian Archaeology 67: 3–11. 
Balme, J., O'Connor, S., Ulm, S., Ross, A. 2008. More Unconsidered Trifles: Papers to Celebrate the Career of Sandra Bowdler. Australian Archaeological Association Inc. 
Balme, J. & Beck, W. 2002. Starch and Charcoal: Useful Measures of Activity Areas in Archaeological Rockshelters. Journal of Archaeological Science 29 (2): 157–166. 
Balme, J. & Toussaint, S. 1999. 'I reckon they should keep that hut': reflections on Aboriginal tracking in the Kimberley. Australian Aboriginal Studies 1: 26–32. 
Balme, J. & Beck, W. 1996. Earth mounds in southeastern Australia. Australian Archaeology 42: 39–51.

References

Further reading 
Full Publication List

Australian archaeologists
Australian women archaeologists
Living people
Academic staff of the University of Western Australia
University of Western Australia alumni
Australian National University alumni
Fellows of the Australian Academy of the Humanities
Year of birth missing (living people)